Bells of Doom is a compilation album of Swedish Symphonic metal band Therion,  released by the official fan club (now called  Therion Society) in 2001. The album was originally available for Therion Society members only but is now available to anyone in Therion's Official online store. It contains rare tracks from early recordings of the band. The first two tracks come from a rehearsal in 1987 when they were still called  Blitzkrieg, the remaining from various Therion demos and unreleased recordings. The album is limited in numbers and will not be reprinted once it has sold out.

Track listing 
 Blitzkrieg – "Rockn' Roll Jam"
 Blitzkrieg – "Scared to Death (Excerpt)"
 Therion – "Bells of Doom"
 Therion – "Macabre Declension"
 Therion – "Paroxysmal Holocaust"
 Therion – "Outro"
 Therion – "Ravaged"
 Therion – "Black (demo)"
 Therion – "Melez (demo)"
 Therion – "Path of the Psychopath"

References

External links 
 
 

2001 compilation albums
Fan-club-release albums
Therion (band) compilation albums